Lecteria is a genus of crane fly in the family Limoniidae.

Distribution
Africa & South America

Species
Subgenus Lecteria Osten Sacken, 1888
L. acanthosoma Alexander, 1969
L. acanthostyla Alexander, 1969
L. africana africana Alexander, 1920
L. africana nigrilinea Alexander, 1920
L. armillaris (Fabricius, 1805)
L. atricauda Alexander, 1920
L. bicornuta Alexander, 1969
L. calopus (Walker, 1856)
L. cetrata Alexander, 1969
L. duchaillui Alexander, 1923
L. fuscitarsis Alexander, 1969
L. hirsutipes Riedel, 1920
L. laticincta Alexander, 1920
L. machadoi Alexander, 1963
L. mattogrossae Alexander, 1913
L. metatarsalba Alexander, 1920
L. microcephala (Bigot, 1858)
L. pluriguttata Alexander, 1920
L. radialis Alexander, 1956
L. reisi Alexander, 1921
L. retrorsa Alexander, 1969
L. simplex Alexander, 1969
L. simpsoni Alexander, 1920
L. tanganicae Alexander, 1921
L. tibialis Alexander, 1923
L. triacanthos Alexander, 1920
L. uniarmillata Alexander, 1956
L. upsilon Alexander, 1969
L. vasta Alexander, 1921
Subgenus Neolecteria Alexander, 1934
L. bipunctata Edwards, 1926
Subgenus Psaronius Enderlein, 1912
L. abnormis Alexander, 1914
L. brevisector Alexander, 1936
L. brevitibia (Alexander, 1920)
L. fuscipennis (Alexander, 1914)
L. legata Alexander, 1948
L. manca (Alexander, 1921)
L. obliterata Alexander, 1913
L. obscura (Fabricius, 1805)
L. pallipes (Alexander, 1920)
L. pygmaea (Alexander, 1914)
L. triangulifera (Alexander, 1921)

References

Limoniidae
Nematocera genera
Diptera of South America
Diptera of Africa